Tisovica is a village in the municipality of Zelenikovo, North Macedonia.

Demographics
As of the 2021 census, Tisovica had 10 residents with the following ethnic composition:
Albanians 9
Macedonians 1

According to the 2002 census, the village had a total of 53 inhabitants. Ethnic groups in the village include:
Albanians 53

References

Villages in Zelenikovo Municipality
Albanian communities in North Macedonia